Havengore Island is a low-lying, marshy island in Essex, England.  It is bounded by New England Creek to the north, Havengore Creek to the south west, the Middleway to the north west, with the North Sea to the south and east. 

It is linked by bridges to the mainland and to New England Island, from which the road continues to Foulness.  Its south east coast borders the North Sea and like its south west shore is protected by levees.

The island has never been heavily populated and now has a few buildings along its single road.  Its southern end is Ministry of Defence land.

HMS Beagle is said to have been used to block one of the channels around the island in its last days.

External links
Wakering History on Havengore Island

Islands of Essex
Rochford District